Rashid Khan (born 1998) is an Afghan cricketer.

Rashid Khan may also refer to:

 Rashid Khan (actor), Indian film actor in Hindi cinema
 Rashid Khan (Nepalese cricketer) (born 2001), Nepalese cricketer
 Rashid Khan (Pakistani cricketer) (born 1959), Pakistani former Test cricketer
 Rashid Khan (golfer) (born 1991), Indian professional golfer
 Rashid Khan (musician) (born 1968), Indian classical musician
 Rashid Akbar Khan, Pakistani politician
 Kamaal Rashid Khan (born 1975), Indian actor
 Rashid Khan Gaplanov (1883–1937), Azerbaijani statesman